The Mercedes F1 W03 is a Formula One racing car designed by Mercedes AMG Petronas Formula One Team for use in the 2012 Formula One season. The car was driven by seven time World Drivers' Champion Michael Schumacher and Nico Rosberg. The car was launched on 21 February, ahead of the second test of the winter testing season. The team used the F1 W03's predecessor, the Mercedes MGP W02, at the first test in Jerez de la Frontera — running for three of the four days — in order to evaluate the 2012 specification of Pirelli tyres. The W03 completed a shakedown at Silverstone on 16 February and carried out a private test at the Circuit de Catalunya in Barcelona on 19 February; under the sporting regulations, the team was entitled to hold a private test as they had only attended three of the four test days at Jerez.

At the 2012 Chinese Grand Prix, Nico Rosberg took Mercedes's first pole position and win since the 1955 Italian Grand Prix.

Design

The F1 W03 was introduced at the first race of the season in Melbourne with what was described as a "radical wing concept". Speculation suggested that the wing used the F-duct concept (developed by McLaren in 2010) by blowing air across the surface of the wing to "stall" it, thereby cancelling out all downforce and drag running over the wing and allowing the car to achieve a higher top speed. The system developed by Mercedes was reported to create an F-duct effect over the front wing when the Drag Reduction System (DRS) flap in the rear wing opened. Opening the flap would expose two vents, which channeled air back through the car and over the front wing, cancelling out the downforce generated by the front wing with the intention of increasing stability in high-speed corners.

Controversy
On the Thursday before the Australian Grand Prix, the FIA's technical delegate Charlie Whiting declared the system to be legal. However, shortly before the final practice session on Saturday afternoon, representatives from Red Bull Racing and Lotus F1 approached the race stewards and requested that the FIA review the original verdict, claiming that the front wing system was in violation of Articles 3.15 and 3.18, which govern the use of DRS and driver-operated aerodynamic devices. On the Thursday before the Malaysian Grand Prix, the FIA rejected all claims that the system was illegal, allowing Mercedes to compete with an unaltered car. Three weeks later in China, Lotus F1 filed a formal protest against the system, citing Article 3.15 of the technical regulations — which states that "any device that influences the car's aerodynamics must remain immobile in relation to the sprung part of the car" — as the basis for their challenge. The stewards later unanimously rejected the protest. They stated that "the sole purpose of the DRS as stated in article 3.18.3, is to improve overtaking. The Mercedes design is completely consistent with this objective" and further clarified that "the protest is dismissed on the grounds that the FIA confirmed the assertion of the Mercedes team that it had, in accordance with Article 2.4 and/or 2.5 of the F1 Technical Regulations, sought clarification from the FIA Formula One Technical Department concerning this matter and the FIA confirmed that the Mercedes design had been deemed permissible", before the start of the season. Lotus later confirmed that they would not appeal against the decision.

Complete Formula One results
(key) (results in bold indicate pole position; results in italics indicate fastest lap)

 Driver failed to finish the race, but was classified as they had completed greater than 90% of the race distance.

References

External links

F1 W03